Congenital hepatic fibrosis  is an inherited fibrocystic liver disease associated with proliferation of interlobular bile ducts within the portal areas and fibrosis that do not alter hepatic lobular architecture. The fibrosis would affect resistance in portal veins leading to portal hypertension.

Cause
The condition is usually congenital, but sporadic cases have also been reported. It may be associated with other congenital defects, commonly with autosomal recessive polycystic kidney disease, the most severe form of PKD. Some suggest that these two conditions are one disorder with different presentation.

Mechanism
Embryogenically, congenital hepatic fibrosis is due to malformation of the duct plate, a round structure appearing in the eighth week of gestation that is formed by primitive hepatocytes, which differentiate into cholangiocytes. Congenital hepatic fibrosis usually presents in adolescent or young adulthood, but onset of signs and symptoms can range from early childhood through mid-life. Clinical features may vary but commonly include cholangitis, hepatomegaly and signs of portal hypertension.

Diagnosis
Liver biopsy is diagnostic. In biopsy there is diffuse periportal and perilobular fibrosis in broad bands, containing distorted duct like structure or microcyst formation.

Management
Management includes control of esophageal bleeding/varices and treatment of associated renal disease if present.

See also
 Caroli disease
 Polycystic kidney disease
 Von Meyenburg complex
 Biliary hamartomas

References

External links 

  GeneReviews/NCBI/NIH/UW entry on Congenital Hepatic Fibrosis Overview

Autosomal recessive disorders
Diseases of liver